Francis Kwame Nyarko is a Ghanaian politician. He served for Kade constituency in the Eastern Region of Ghana.

Politics 
Nyarko is a member of the 2nd parliament of the 4th republic of Ghana who took seat during the 1996 Ghanaian general election. He served for the New Patriotic Party after he defeated John Darlington Brobbey of National Democratic Congress with 19,616 votes cast. He was succeeded by Ofosu Asamoah of New Patriotic Party during the 2000 Ghanaian general election.

References 

Ghanaian MPs 1997–2001
New Patriotic Party politicians
Eastern Region (Ghana)
Living people
Year of birth missing (living people)